KKEX (96.7 FM) is a radio station licensed to Preston, Idaho, United States, the station serves the Ogden-Clearfield metropolitan area.  The station is currently owned by Sun Valley Radio.

KKEX carries its programming in HD, and has one subchannel. HD-1 is KKEX-HD, and HD-2 is a simulcast of KGNT.

History
The station was assigned the call letters KQBD on 1991-08-09.  On 1991-08-22, the station changed its call sign to KACH-FM and on 1994-07-20 it changed to the current KKEX.

Translators and booster
In addition to the main station, KKEX is relayed by translators and a booster to widen its broadcast area.

References

External links

KEX
Country radio stations in the United States
Radio stations established in 2000
2000 establishments in Idaho